The Women's T20 Super League is a women's domestic Twenty20 cricket tournament organised by Cricket South Africa. The tournament began in September 2019, with four teams taking part; these teams were renamed for a second competition in December 2019. The third competition took place in December 2020, which was won by Coronations. The competition took place again in December 2022, with no overall winner crowned due to the amount of matches abandoned due to rain.

The tournament aims to give more game time and competition for South Africa's best women players, with players organised into teams and playing matches at the same ground over a weekend.

History
The tournament began in 2019, conceived as a way of giving the best South African women cricketers more game time and more competitive cricket. The first tournament took place over a weekend in September 2019, with four teams playing each other once. The four teams were named after their coaches: Dinesha Devnarain, Martelize van der Merwe, Francois van der Merwe and Claire Terblanche, with the Devnarain XI winning all of their matches to win the title.

The second edition of the tournament took place later that year, in December 2019. The competition retained the same format, but the teams were renamed: Devnarain XI becoming Coronations, Terblanche XI becoming Starlights, F van der Merwe XI becoming Thistles and M van der Merwe XI becoming Duchesses. Starlights, Duchesses and Coronations all won two matches each, with Starlights triumphing on Net Run Rate.

The third edition of the Super League took place in December 2020, with a Virtual Draft taking place before the tournament to allocate players. Coronations won their second title (and first under their new name), winning two matches and edging out runners-up Thistles on Net Run Rate.

The tournament returned in December 2022 for its fourth edition, with a South Africa Under-19 team replacing Duchesses in the four-team competition. With five matches abandoned due to rain, no overall winner was crowned. Starlights finished top of the group standings, winning all of their completed matches.

Teams

Results

Notes

References

Women's T20 Super League
South African domestic cricket competitions
Women's cricket competitions in South Africa
Recurring sporting events established in 2019
Twenty20 cricket leagues